Psorosticha is a moth genus of the superfamily Gelechioidea. It is included in the family Depressariidae, which is sometimes – particularly in older treatments – considered a subfamily of the Oecophoridae or included in the Elachistidae.

Species
 Psorosticha melanocrepida Clarke, 1962 (Japan)
 Psorosticha neglecta Diakonoff, [1968] (Philippines)
 Psorosticha zizyphi (Stainton, 1859) (Australasia, Oriental, China)

References

Markku Savela's Lepidoptera site
De Prins, J. & De Prins, W. 2014. Afromoths, online database of Afrotropical moth species (Lepidoptera). World Wide Web electronic publication (www.afromoths.net) (12.Aug.2014)
Lower, 1901. Descriptions of New Genera and Species of Australian Lepidoptera.  Trans. R. Soc. S. Aust. 25 : 91.

 
Depressariinae